"Go" is the second single from The Chemical Brothers eighth studio album Born in the Echoes. The single was announced on 23 April 2015 on Facebook and released on 4 May 2015. The song has uncredited vocals from Q-Tip.

Awards
The song received a nomination for Best Dance Recording at the 58th Grammy Awards.

As of September 2017, the single was certified Silver by British Phonographic Industry.

Music video
The official music video was posted on the band's YouTube page on 4 May 2015. It was directed by Michel Gondry. In the video, seven women wearing vintage sci-fi outfits march through the brutalist architecture of the Front de Seine district in Paris.

In other media
The song was featured in the 2015 video game Need for Speed, the 2017 film Baywatch, the launch trailer of Crash Bandicoot 4: It's About Time, the 2021 mobile rhythm game Beatstar, and the 2022 film The Bad Guys.

Advertisers have also used the song, including in ads for PlayStation, Go Outdoors, the GMC Terrain, Vodafone, and Flagstar Bank.

Charts

Certifications

Release history

References

The Chemical Brothers songs
2015 singles
2015 songs
Virgin EMI Records singles
Music videos directed by Michel Gondry
Songs written by Q-Tip (musician)
Songs written by Tom Rowlands
Songs written by Ed Simons